Women In (E)motion is an Import CD release by Ani DiFranco from 1994.  The set was recorded live at Schauburg in Bremen, Germany on July 8, 1994 for the Women In (E)motion festival series on Radio Bremen and released by Tradition & Moderne Records. It has catalog #T&M105.

Track listing
"Buildings and Bridges" – 3:19
"Letter to a John" – 3:49
"Face Up and Sing" – 2:43
"Out of Range" – 3:35
"Not So Soft" – 3:40
"Lullaby (Cradle and All)" – 4:15
"Asking Too Much" – 3:26
"Sorry I Am" – 4:30
"In or Out" – 3:04
"If He Tries Anything" – 3:09
"Blood in the Boardroom" – 3:25

Personnel
Ani DiFranco – vocals, guitars, darbuka
Andy Stochansky - drums, djembe

References

Ani DiFranco live albums
1994 live albums